Mastigoteuthis pyrodes is a species of whip-lash squid.

References
Young, R.E. 1972. The systematics and areal distribution of pelagic cephalopods from the seas off Southern California. Smithson. Contributions Zool. 97: 1-159.

External links

Tree of Life web project: Mastigoteuthis pyrodes

Mastigoteuthis